Whatcha Been Doing is the second studio album by American singer Lutricia McNeal.

Track listing

Charts

References 

1999 albums
Lutricia McNeal albums